The Men competition at the 2022 World Sprint Speed Skating Championships was held from 3 to 5 March 2022.

Results

500 m
The race started on 3 March at 17:59.

1000 m
The race started on 3 March at 19.23.

500 m
The race started on 4 March at 17:58.

1000 m
The race started on 4 March at 19:23.

Overall standings
After all races.

Team sprint
The race started on 5 March at 18:11.

References

Men